"Lonely" is a song by Danish electropop singer Medina from her international debut album Welcome to Medina. It was released as album's second single on 3 September 2010 in Germany, Austria and Switzerland. Co-written by American singer Terri Bjerre, the song is an English version of "Ensom", which was released as the third single from Medina's second Danish studio album on 2 November 2009 in Denmark.

Track listing
German CD single
"Lonely" – 3:09
"Lonely" (Svenstrup & Vendelboe Remix) – 4:48

German digital download
"Lonely" (Single Edit) – 3:12   
"Lonely" (DBN RMX) – 5:19     
"Lonely" (Svenstrup & Vendelboe Remix) – 4:50    
"Lonely" (Massimo Nocito & Jewelz Remix) – 6:13    
"Lonely" (Plastik Funk's Dirty House RMX) – 7:28     
"Lonely" (Gooseflesh Remix) – 5:29

Personnel
Songwriting – Medina Valbak, Rasmus Stabell, Jeppe Federspiel, Terri Bjerre
Production and instruments – Providers
Vocals – Medina
Mixing and mastering – Anders Schuman, Providers

Source:

Charts

Release history

References

2010 singles
Medina (singer) songs
Songs written by Terri Bjerre
Songs written by Rasmus Stabell
Songs written by Jeppe Federspiel
2010 songs
EMI Records singles
Songs written by Medina (singer)